Maria Lankowitz is a small market township near Köflach in the district of Voitsberg in the Austrian state of Styria, at the foot of the Stubalpe mountain.

History
Maria Lankowitz was first mentioned in records in 1415. The 15th-century church is the most important Styrian place of pilgrimage after Mariazell.

Economy
On the mountain pastures, where the Lipizzaner horses to the Spanish Riding School in Vienna graze in summer, there are ski pistes and cross-country ski runs. The former coal mines have been turned into a lake and a golf course.

References

Cities and towns in Voitsberg District